Manawatu United (previously known as YoungHeart Manawatu) was a football club based in Palmerston North, New Zealand. It participated in the New Zealand Football Championship, and fielded a youth side in the National Youth League. Their home ground was Memorial Park.

In 2014, the team was renamed to Manawatu United.

History 

Manawatu United was formed in 2004, under the name YoungHeart Manawatu, to compete in the New Zealand Football Championship (NZFC). Based in Palmerston North, they were the sole franchise in the region.

In the inaugural NZFC season (2004–2005), Manawatu United finished bottom of the league.

However, in 2005–2006 they finished runner-up to champions Auckland City FC at the end of the regular season. In the finals, United lost both their playoff matches and exited early.

The 2006–07 season saw Manawatu United finish second again at the conclusion of the regular season, this time behind Waitakere United. United lost their preliminary final to Auckland and missed out on a spot in the O-League as a result.

2007–08 was a somewhat disappointing campaign given the success of the previous two seasons. Manawatu United finished the regular season placed sixth on the table, well adrift of the playoffs.

A return to the playoffs came in the 2008/09 season, as United finished in third place in the condensed regular season. What followed was an emphatic two-goal victory in the first leg of a two-legged semi-final against Auckland City FC in Palmerston North. In the return leg Auckland used their home advantage equally as well to win 3–0, consigning Manawatu to a 4–3 defeat on aggregate and another missed grand final and O-League appearance. Auckland went on to win the final.

2009–10 was a frustrating season for the Manawatu United faithful as the side finished in sixth place but only two points away from a playoff spot. Perhaps the highlight of the season was an unexpected 4–1 victory over Auckland City at Kiwitea Street.

A bittersweet moment came during the 2010 off-season as standout young player Cory Chettleburgh signed a contract with professional Dutch club Sparta Rotterdam. This was a significant loss for the side as they looked to bounce back from a fairly disappointing campaign.

Folding 
Due to the ASB Youth League being reduced to only the 10 teams given licenses to the 2016–17 ASB Premiership, Manawatu United dissolved at the end of the 2015 ASB Youth League Season.

Ground 

Memorial Park was the home ground of Manawatu United. They had played at this ground since the 2008–09 season, having previously played their home fixtures at Central Energy Trust Arena. Memorial Park has a capacity of approximately 8000 people.

Squad 
2010–11

Staff 

 Team Manager:  Steve Green.
 Head coach:  Stu Jacobs.
 Assistant coach:  Andy Sawyer.
 Goalkeeper coach:  Steve Green.
 Physiotherapist:  Rodney Brooks-Mann.
 General Manager:  Neil Perry
 Sponsorship & Marketing Manager:

Club Records 
 All-time leading goalscorer: Benjamin Totori (33)
 Most goals in a season: Benjamin Totori (24 in 2006/07 season)
 Biggest win: 8–1 vs. Hawke's Bay United, 2005/06 season
 Biggest loss: 0–8 vs. Team Wellington, 2007/08 season

Managers 
  Shane Rufer (July 2006 – June 2008)
  Bob Sova (July 2008 – June 2011)
  Stu Jacobs (July 2011–15)

Performance in OFC competitions 
Oceania Club Championship: (1 appearance)
 2006 – 3rd place – Won against Nokia Eagles  4 – 0 (stage 4 of 4)

References

External links 
 New Zealand Football Championship (official league site)
 Official club site
Youth Soccer Palmerston North

Association football clubs in Palmerston North
Association football clubs established in 2004
2004 establishments in New Zealand
Sport in Manawatū-Whanganui
Association football clubs disestablished in 2015
2015 disestablishments in New Zealand